The Guadalete River is located almost entirely in the Spanish Province of Cádiz, rising in the Sierra de Grazalema Natural Park at an elevation of about , and running for  into the Bay of Cádiz at El Puerto de Santa Maria, north of the city of Cádiz. The river's name comes from the Arabic phrase وادي لكة (Wadi lakath) meaning "River of Forgetfulness".

Course 
From its source in the Sierra de Grazalema, the Guadalete passes:
Grazalema
The Reservoir (Embalse) of Zahara
Puerto Solano
Briefly enters Seville province and reenters Cádiz province
Villamartín
The Reservoir (Embalse) of Bornos
The Reservoir (Embalse) of Arcos
Arcos de la Frontera
La Barca de la Florida
Lomopardo and El Portal (near Jerez de la Frontera)

It then flows into the Bay of Cádiz, in the city of El Puerto de Santa María.

There are several dams with reservoirs along its course, including the Embalse de Zahara and the Embalse de Bornos. The "Sierra Greenway", a  bicycle path reclaimed from an abandoned railroad line, also passes along the river.

The largest tributaries of the Guadalete are the Guadalporcún, and the Majaceite, which joins it at Junta de los Ríos downstream from Arcos de la Frontera.

Historic importance 
The river was once the frontier between Christian and Moorish Iberia, receiving the sobriquet Río de los Muertos (river of the dead).

The river may have been the location of the Battle of Guadalete in 711, at which the Visigothic army was defeated by an invading Muslim army, leading to the conquest of Iberia by the Umayyad Caliphate.

See also 
 List of rivers of Spain
 San Pedro River, Cádiz

References

External links 

Rivers of Spain
Rivers of Andalusia
Geography of the Province of Cádiz